Dance is a performing art form consisting of purposefully selected sequences of human movement. Dance (Nepal Bhasa:प्याखं/प्याखङ)() in Nepal comprises numerous styles of dances, including folk, ethnic, classical to modern dances. Lakhey is the dance of a demon in the carnival of God. Durbar Square, a historic plaza in Kathmandu, Nepal, facing ancient palaces and adorned by Hindu temples, is always full of eager crowds on the last day of Indra Jatra, the festival celebrating Indra, the Hindu king of heaven. In this divine stage, Lakhe the demon dances among gods and deities relentlessly and carelessly.

Origin 

Legends state that dances in this country originated in the abode of Lord Shiva — the Himalayas, where he performed the tandava dance. This indicates that dance traditions of Nepal are very ancient and unique. With altitudes and ethnicity, the dances of Nepal slightly change in style as well as in the costumes.

Ethnic and cultural dances 

 Lakhey Pyakhan: performed during the Yenya festival in the month of September. 
 Bhairab Pyakhan: popular among Newar community in Kathmandu valley. 
 Chacha Pyakhan: is a Buddhist ritual dance with a history going back more than 1,000 years. It is performed by Newar Buddhist priests known as Bajracharya as part of their esoteric meditation practices and rituals. The dancers represent various deities like the Five Buddhas, Manjusri, Vajrayogini and Tara.
 Kumha Pyakhan: is a sacred dance of the Tuladhar and Kansakar caste groups of the Newars of Kathmandu. The dance is performed in temple and market squares during religious festivals. 
 Gathu Pyakhan: is a sacred masked dance of the Newar people of the Kathmandu Valley, Nepal. 
 Nava Durga Pyakhan: starts from mohani and ends in Bhagasti. It is famous around Newar community in Bhaktapur. 
 Maruni Dance: traditional dance popular in Eastern Nepal, Sikkim, Assam, and Darjeeling, popular among Magar, Gurung, Kirati and It is believed to be originated from Magar Army during 14 the century on the behalf of sick King Balihang Rana Magar of Palpa, Pokhara Butwal.
 Deuda naach: popular in Karnali and far-west provinces. 
 Chyabrung Naach: the traditional dance of the Limbu people, living mainly in the Eastern part of Nepal.
 Dhan Nach: the traditional dance of the Limbu people, living mainly in the Eastern part of Nepal.
 Mayur Naach; Peacock Dance: performed by western magar specially Kham Magar, popular in the Mid-Western part of Nepal, especially Rolpa and Rukum.
 Sakela Naach: the traditional dance of the Khambu (Rai) community worshipping Lord Paruhang  and Goddess Sumnima .
 Ghatu Nritya: performed among the Magar & Gurung community in western Nepal.
 Sorathi Nritya: performed among the Magar & Gurung community in western Nepal.
 Hanuman Nritya: Popular in central Nepal
 Dishka Dance: performed at weddings, includes intricate footwork and arm movements.
Hurra Dance: performed by Eastern Magar community
Jhijhiya Dance: popular in the western and central terai among Maithili community . Women put holey earthen pot with fire inside, on their head and dance in a group during dashain.
Jatjatin Dance: it is based on folk songs of Tharu community which they perform from Shrawan Purnima to Bhadra Purnima. It is based on the love story of hero jat and heroine Jatin and their lives.
Gauna Dance: It belongs to the Mithila tradition and is popular in the Janakpur region and is performed on religious and festive occasion.
Baalan Dance: It is performed by depicting the character of Lord Ram and Lord Krishna etc. especially by brahmin and Chhetri community.
Syabru Dance: It is a folk dance of Sherpa and other Himalayan communities of Nepal.

Gallery

See also 
 Culture of Nepal
 Music of Nepal

References

External links 

 https://artsandculture.google.com/exhibit/infamous-but-captivating-lakhe-dance-of-nepal-ichcap/XAJyVo4jDR4cLA?hl=en https://blog.massfolkarts.org/index.php/2018/07/nepalese-lakhe-mask-dancer-raj-kapoor/ https://www.alamy.com/stock-photo/lakhe-dancer.html

 
Arts in Nepal